Nana Ama Dokua Asiamah Adjei is the member of parliament for the constituency. She was elected on the ticket of the New Patriotic Party (NPP) in 2016. She was preceded by Lawyer William Ofori Boafo. Prominent towns in the constituency include Akropong, Mamfe, Adawso, Kwamoso, Tinkon and Okorase.

See also
List of Ghana Parliament constituencies

References

Parliamentary constituencies in the Eastern Region (Ghana)